Murali Sharma (born 9 August 1972) is an Indian actor who works predominently in Telugu and Hindi films. Sharma has starred in over 130 feature films including Telugu, Hindi, Tamil, Marathi and Malayalam cinema.

Sharma gained wide recognition in television with Doordarshan's Paltan in which he plays the lead role of Col. R.S. Sajwan. Sharma has appeared in various soap operas such as Guns and Roses, Siddanth, Laagi Tujhse Lagan, Mahayagya, Viraasat, Zindhagi Teri Meri Kahani, Rishtey, Humne lee hain shapath, and Rangeela Ratan Sisodia.

Early and personal life
Murali Sharma was born on 9 August 1972 in Guntur, Andhra Pradesh and was brought up in Mumbai. His father, Vrijbhushan Sharma is a Marathi, while his mother Padma Sharma is a Telugu from Guntur. Sharma calls himself a "Bombaywala". He completed his bachelor's degree, and studied acting at the Roshan Taneja Acting School in Mumbai. He is married to actress Ashwini Kalsekar.

Career

Murli Sharma appeared as Captain Khan in the 2004 Bollywood movie Main Hoon Na alongside Shahrukh Khan. In 2007, he had roles in the Hindi movies Dhol, Dhamaal, Black Friday, and the Telugu movies Athidhi and Kantri. He received a Nandi Award for his dual role of Kaiser/Ajay Shastri in Athithi. In 2008, he made an appearance in the Bollywood film Jaane Tu... Ya Jaane Na and appeared in Golmaal Returns and Sunday.

In 2011, Sharma had supporting roles in Singham, Oosaravelli, starring Jr. NTR and Dhoni in Telugu. He continued to work in Hindi and Telugu, and in 2012 he had his first role in a Malayalam film Karmayodha starring Mohanlal. In 2013 he also worked in the Tamil and Marathi film industries.

In 2015, he had larger roles in Gopala Gopala and Bhale Bhale Magadivoy. He also worked in Badlapur, ABCD 2, and the Tamil film Paayum Puli. In 2016, he appeared in Krishna Gaadi Veera Prema Gaadha, Savithri, Sanam Teri Kasam and Wazir. He also did main role in DJ: Duvvada Jagannadham (2017), in 2018 Agnyaathavaasi and Vijetha, in 2019 Saaho, in 2020 Ala Vaikunthapurramuloo, Sarileru Neekevvaru and Street Dancer 3D. He played role of Valmiki in the movie Ala Vaikunthapuramloo.

In 2021, he appeared in A1 Express, Sreekaram, Jathi Ratnalu and Chaavu Kaburu Challaga.

Awards
He received the Nandi Award for Best Villain in 2007 for Athidhi. He also received the SIIMA Award for Best Supporting Actor – Telugu for Ala Vaikunthapurramuloo in 2021. ‘New Life Theological University’ awarded  Murali Sharma an honorary doctorate for his contributions to the welfare of society in 2021.

Filmography

Films

Television

References

External links

 
 

Indian male television actors
Indian male soap opera actors
Living people
Telugu people
Marathi people
Telugu male actors
Male actors in Telugu cinema
Indian male film actors
Male actors in Hindi cinema
Male actors from Andhra Pradesh
Nandi Award winners
20th-century Indian male actors
21st-century Indian male actors
1972 births
South Indian International Movie Awards winners